The delicate deer mouse (Habromys delicatulus) is a species of rodent in the family Cricetidae. It was first described by Michael Carlton, Oscar Sanchez and Guillermina Urbano-Vidales after being discovered in a patch of cloud forest on the Trans-Mexican Volcanic Belt. The species gets its name from its small size and delicate features compared to the other species within the genus Habromys.

References

 Carleton, Sánchez & Urbano Vidales: A new species of Habromys (Muroidea: Neotominae) from México, with generic review of species definitions and remarks on diversity patterns among Mesoamerican small mammals restricted to humid montane forests.

Habromys
Deer mouse
Deer mouse
Fauna of the Trans-Mexican Volcanic Belt
Mammals described in 2002
Taxa named by Michael D. Carleton
Deer mouse
Critically endangered fauna of North America